Moil is a northern suburb of the city of Darwin, Northern Territory, Australia.

History
Moil was built before Cyclone Tracy in 1974. It derives its name from the Aboriginal people on the Moyle River who inhabit an area on the lower reaches of the Daly River and around Port Keats.

References

External links

https://web.archive.org/web/20110629040718/http://www.nt.gov.au/lands/lis/placenames/origins/greaterdarwin.shtml#m

Suburbs of Darwin, Northern Territory